Shannon O'Keefe (née Rondeau, born January 27, 1979) is an American professional bowler and bowling coach now living in Shiloh, Illinois, who has competed in the United States and internationally.  She is an 18-time member of Team USA (2005–present) and an eight-time World Champion (Individual titles in Singles in 2007 and All-Events in 2013, also the 2013 Doubles, 2011 and 2017 Trios, and 2011 and 2015 Teams at the World Championships; plus the gold medal in Singles at 2022 World Games in Birmingham, AL). She also won the 54th QubicaAMF World Cup in 2018 in Las Vegas. Shannon also won the 2019 Doubles gold medal at the Pan American Games in Peru. 

O'Keefe has 15 titles on the PWBA Tour, including three major championships, and is a three-time PWBA Player of the Year (2018, 2019 and 2022). Since 2014, she has also been the women's bowling coach at McKendree University. Her teams have won two NCAA Women's Bowling National Championships.

After a long association with Hammer Bowling, O'Keefe is now a member of the Roto Grip pro staff. She is also sponsored by VISE grips, Coolwick sportswear and BowlerX.com.

Bowling career

Original PWBA Tour
O'Keefe began competing on the PWBA Tour in 1998, and was runner-up for the Rookie of the Year award in 1999. The PWBA Tour ceased operations in 2003.

PWBA hiatus and Team USA
After giving up her professional status shortly after the original PWBA folded and waiting to regain her amateur status, O'Keefe won the New York State Queens Title (twice) along with three Rochester, New York Queens titles.  She earned a spot on Team USA in her first attempt in 2005, and has been a member for the last 15 years. After moving to Texas in 2008, she won the Texas Bluebonnet Queens three times in a four-year span (2011, 2012 and 2014).

Other bowling highlights include a fifth-place finish in the 2007 USBC Queens Tournament, and a runner-up finish in the 2007 U.S. Women's Open.  She bowled a 299 on television in the U.S. Open quarterfinals, and at the time tied a record for the most consecutive strikes in a row on television (18 over two games). She finished in fifth place in the 2011 U.S. Women's Open, and in third place at the 2012 U.S. Women's Open. O'Keefe has won numerous gold, silver and bronze medals in international competition as a member of Team USA.  She was an exempt bowler in 2009 in the PBA Women's Series, which was sponsored by the United States Bowling Congress (USBC).  She made the quarterfinals of the 2009 PBA Women's World Championship, which was the first women's World Championship under PBA sanction.

In 2010, against mostly male competitors, O'Keefe won a PBA Regional Tour title at the PBA Southwest Region Del-Mar Lanes Challenge.

O'Keefe was part of Team USA in 2011—the team that went to the WTBA World Women's Championships in Hong Kong and took home gold for the United States in the team event for the first time since 1987.

O'Keefe announced early in 2022 that she would be retiring as a Team USA member, after 18 consecutive years representing her country in international competition. She capped her career wearing the red, white and blue with three medals at the PanAm Bowling Champion of Champions event held August 22-25 in Rio de Janeiro, Brazil. O'Keefe won gold in Doubles with partner Bryanna Coté (part of a USA Doubles sweep, as Kris Prather and A. J. Johnson also won gold in the men's event), while also taking gold in All Events. She won silver in the Singles event, finishing behind Clara Guerrero of Colombia.

PWBA rebirth

2015
The PWBA Tour was relaunched in 2015. Shannon was one of several previous PWBA members to re-join the tour. She is one of two players (with Danielle McEwan) to have won at least one title every season since the re-launch.

On August 2, 2015, Shannon won her first PWBA title in the Striking Against Breast Cancer Mixed Doubles championship, teaming with PBA player Bill O'Neill to take the top prize. In the 2015 U.S. Women's Open, O'Keefe qualified as the #1 seed but had to settle for her second runner-up finish in this tournament, as she was defeated by Liz Johnson in the September 6 final by a single pin, 190–189.

2016
O'Keefe won her first PWBA singles title, and second PWBA title overall, in the Nationwide PWBA Sonoma County Open on May 26, 2016. Qualifying as the #2 seed, she defeated Singapore's New Hui Fen in the semifinal match before besting Kelly Kulick in the finals. Later in the 2016 season, O'Keefe led the Pepsi PWBA Lincoln Open wire-to-wire (from opening round of qualifying through to the finals) and captured her third PWBA title on June 26. On July 31, 2016, O'Keefe and Bill O'Neill repeated as champions at the Striking Against Breast Cancer Mixed Doubles championship, giving O'Keefe her fourth PWBA title, and third of the 2016 season.

2017
On August 6, 2017, O'Keefe won her fifth PWBA title in the St. Petersburg-Clearwater Open, defeating Colombia's Clara Guerrero in the final match. The win qualified O'Keefe for the season-ending Smithfield PWBA Tour Championship, which she subsequently won on September 6 by defeating Kelly Kulick in the final match. This was O'Keefe's sixth PWBA title and first career major. O'Keefe finished the 2017 season ranked third in points (behind Liz Johnson and Kelly Kulick), and second in match play appearances with 10 (one behind Liz Johnson).

2018
O'Keefe won her seventh PWBA title on May 5, 2018 at the PWBA Sonoma County Open, winning a high-scoring final match over England's Verity Crawley, 268–266. On May 22, O'Keefe won her eighth PWBA title and second career major at the USBC Queens in Reno, NV. Shannon was named PWBA Player of the Year following the second-to-last tournament of the 2018 season, having mathematically eliminated all other players. In addition to her two titles (one major), she led the Tour in final round appearances and earnings.

On November 10, 2018 O'Keefe won the QubicaAMF World Cup (a worldwide, non-PWBA Tour event), defeating Sin Li Jane from Malaysia in Sams Town bowling center, Las Vegas. Also in 2018, O'Keefe won the BPAA's Dick Weber Bowling Ambassador Award, an honor given annually to the "bowling athlete who has consistently shown grace on and off the lanes by promoting the sport of bowling in a positive manner."

2019
On May 4, 2019, O'Keefe captured her ninth PWBA title at the PWBA Twin Cities Open. She reached the ten-title plateau on June 8, 2019, earning the win at the PWBA Tucson Open. On August 3, O'Keefe won her third title of the 2019 season and 11th overall at the PWBA East Hartford Open. Two weeks later, on August 17, O'Keefe became the first player since 2001 to win at least four titles in a PWBA Tour season, capturing her 12th title overall at the BowlerX.com PWBA Orlando Open. In the 2019 PWBA Players Championship, O'Keefe climbed the ladder from the #5 seed to the championship match, but lost the title to #1 seed Cherie Tan of Singapore. However, Shannon's second place finish earned her enough points to lock up her second consecutive PWBA Player of the Year award. In the first 13 events of the 2019 season, O'Keefe made the championship finals six times, posting a 9–2 record in her matches. O'Keefe completed her remarkable 2019 season with her 13th PWBA title and third career major by winning the PWBA Tour Championship on September 18. In a dominant season, O'Keefe finished more than 30,000 points ahead of runner-up Danielle McEwan (148,125 to 117,085). She also led the 2019 Tour in earnings ($87,275) and championship round appearances (7), and had the highest average (215.63) among bowlers who participated in at least ten events.

2020
With the 2020 PWBA Tour being cancelled due to the COVID-19 pandemic, the PBA Tour added two women's teams to its 2020 PBA League tournament.  In the July 7 expansion draft, O'Keefe was chosen first overall by Phoenix Fury manager Kim Terrell-Kearney.

2021
O'Keefe won the season-opening event of the 2021 PWBA Tour season, earning her 14th career title at the Bowlers Journal Classic on January 21. This marks the sixth consecutive PWBA Tour season in which Shannon has won at least one title. Only Danielle McEwan has matched this feat through 2021. O'Keefe had a chance to win her third consecutive PWBA Player of the Year award in the season-ending PWBA Tour Championship. Qualifying as the fifth and final seed for the televised finals, she needed to win her first match to move up to fourth and earn the necessary points, but she lost to #4 seed Stephanie Zavala. Shannon finished runner-up to Bryanna Coté for Player of the Year, but did win the High Average Award for the 2021 season.

2022
O'Keefe made the televised finals in two of the first three 2022 events. She won the 2022 Twin Cities Open from the #4 seed position, climbing the ladder by defeating  Dasha Kovalova, Bryanna Cote, Danielle McEwan and top seed Missy Parkin for her 15th career PWBA title. O'Keefe made the championship finals in 7 of 11 singles events during the 2022 season, and never finished lower than seventh in any event. Her fifth-place finish in the season-ending PWBA Tour Championship gave her enough points to win her third PWBA Player of the Year award. For the season, she placed first in points, average, championship round appearances and match play appearances, while tying for first in cashes. O'Keefe is now the only bowler to win at least one title per season since the PWBA relaunch in 2015. She had shared that distinction with Danielle McEwan until McEwan failed to win a title in the 2022 season.

Career PWBA titles
Major championships are in bold text. 

 2015 PBA-PWBA Striking Against Breast Cancer Mixed Doubles w/Bill O'Neill (Houston, TX)
 2016 Nationwide PWBA Sonoma County Open (Rohnert Park, CA)
 2016 Pepsi PWBA Lincoln Open (Lincoln, NE)
 2016 PBA-PWBA Striking Against Breast Cancer Mixed Doubles w/Bill O’Neill (Houston, TX)
 2017 PWBA St. Petersburg-Clearwater Open (Seminole, FL)
 2017 Smithfield PWBA Tour Championship (Richmond, VA)
 2018 Nationwide PWBA Sonoma County Open (Rohnert Park, CA)
 2018 USBC Queens (Reno, NV)
 2019 PWBA Twin Cities Open (Eagan, MN)
 2019 PWBA Tucson Open (Tucson, AZ)
 2019 PWBA East Hartford Open (East Hartford, CT)
 2019 BowlerX PWBA Orlando Open (Orlando, FL)
 2019 PWBA Tour Championship (Richmond, VA)
 2021 PWBA Bowlers Journal Classic (Arlington, TX)
 2022 PWBA Twin Cities Open (Eagan, MN)

Coaching career
In her first year as head coach of the McKendree University women's bowling team (2014), Shannon led her team to an 11th-place ranking in NTCA. In 2017, her McKendree Bearcats won both the NCAA Women's Bowling Championships and the USBC Intercollegiate Team Championships. In 2018, McKendree again made the finals of the NCAA Women's Bowling Championships and USBC Intercollegiate Team Championships, but had to settle for runner-up finishes in both events. O’Keefe was also named NCAA DII/DIII coach of the Year in 2016, 2017, and 2018. In April 2019, McKendree bowler Breanna Clemmer won the Intercollegiate Singles Championship.

On April 16, 2022, O'Keefe's Bearcats won the school's second NCAA Women's Bowling National Championship, defeating Stephen F. Austin four games to none in the best-of-seven Baker format team final.

Other Accomplishments

Prior to her bowling success, O'Keefe was a first team all-American centerfielder in softball, while attending Portland State University.  She had a .411 batting average as a freshman, with 15 outfield assists.  As a 15-year-old, she was among the final 160 women competing for a spot on the 1996 Team USA Softball Team.  O'Keefe was recognized at the Oregon Hayward Awards in 2007 as a finalist for "Professional Woman Athlete of the Year".

Personal life

O'Keefe did not start bowling until age 16 when, as she said in a 2007 interview, "My little brother bowled in a league...I went to pick him up, got there early, and saw some really cute boys." She soon joined her brother's league and fell in love with the sport. She met Bryan O'Keefe at age 20 when the two were bowling at the 1999 Super Hoinke tournament in Cincinnati. He became her coach, mentor and eventual husband. Bryan is a former men's bowling coach at McKendree University (later a member of the athletic department staff), where Shannon coaches the women's team. In 2021, Bryan was named head coach of Team USA, after serving as head coach of Junior Team USA since 2017.

O'Keefe says she loves playing golf and "watching football for the first eight weeks of the season, (until) I realize the Buffalo Bills are still terrible and I lose interest." While she and her husband lived in Greece, New York, they were Bills season ticket holders.

References

1979 births
Living people
20th-century American women
21st-century American women
American ten-pin bowling players
Portland State University alumni
Place of birth missing (living people)
Pan American Games medalists in bowling
Pan American Games gold medalists for the United States
Pan American Games silver medalists for the United States
Pan American Games bronze medalists for the United States
Medalists at the 2019 Pan American Games
Competitors at the 2022 World Games
World Games gold medalists
World Games silver medalists
World Games medalists in bowling